Pusula radians, the "radiant button shell"or "radiating trivia", is a species of small sea snail, a marine gastropod mollusk in the family Triviidae, the false cowries or trivias.

Description
The shell is ovate and pinkish. It has small pale brown spots and wart-like tubercles on the dorsum, and strong transverse ribs on the base. As is the case is all the members of this family, the aperture runs the length of the shell and has teeth along the margins.

Distribution
This species is widespread along the coast of Mexico including the Baja California peninsula, Ecuador, Nicaragua and Peru. It lives under rocks below the intertidal zone in coastal waters.

References
 Biolib
 
 WoRMS
 Discover Life
 Angeline Myra Keen   Sea Shells of Tropical West America: Marine Mollusks

Triviidae
Gastropods described in 1810